Sergio Daniel Urribarri (born 7 October 1958) is an Argentine Justicialist Party (PJ) politician and former governor of Entre Ríos Province. Since 2020 he has been Argentina's ambassador to Israel.  In April 2022 he resigned from office after being sentenced to eight years and a perpetual ban from public office for the crimes of negotiations incompatible with public service and embezzlement.

Biography
Born in the village of Arroyo Barú, Entre Ríos, to Antonia Martínez, a schoolteacher, and Arturo Urribarri, a railway engineer. Urribarri grew up and attended school in Colón, before moving to General Campos, where at the age of 20 he became Director of the public library. He was a successful footballer for the town's club, and in 1985 he was elected Mayor of General Campos. He and his wife Analía married in 1981 and have five sons; one of them, Bruno Urribarri, became a football defender for Club Atlético Colón. 

Urribarri had a lengthy tenure as director of the Concordia Football League and was elected provincial deputy on three occasions, sitting in the provincial legislature between 1991 and 2003. He served as head of CAFESG, the governing body of the hydroelectric plant at the Salto Grande Dam from 2003, and then as minister of government, justice, education and public works under Governor Jorge Busti, from 2004.

Urribarri was elected Governor on the Front for Victory slate in March 2007. He and Busti were on opposite sides of the 2008 Argentine government conflict with the agricultural sector over higher export tariffs proposed by President Cristina Kirchner (whom Urribarri supported). He bested the UCR candidate, Gustavo Cusinato, with 47% of the vote to Cusinato's 20%. He was re-elected in 2011 with 56% of the vote, defeating Atilio Benedetti of the UCR-led Progressive Civic Front Alliance as well as Busti, who ran on a Federal Peronist ticket.

Following the president's decision in March 2012 to partly renationalize the nation's leading energy firm, YPF, Urribarri suggested as a potential adviser or director Schlumberger oil engineer and executive Miguel Galluccio; the Entre Ríos native was appointed CEO of YPF upon the firm's renationalization on May 5.  

In 2019 the Argentine government touted him to be the country's ambassador in the State of Israel. On 7 January 2020 his credentials were accepted by the Israeli government.

References

External links 
  Entre Ríos Province

1958 births
Living people
People from Entre Ríos Province
Argentine people of Basque descent
Mayors of places in Argentina
Justicialist Party politicians
Governors of Entre Ríos Province